In geometry, a flexible polyhedron is a polyhedral surface without any boundary edges, whose shape can be continuously changed while keeping the shapes of all of its faces unchanged.  The Cauchy rigidity theorem shows that in dimension 3 such a polyhedron cannot be convex (this is also true in higher dimensions).

They are self-intersecting surfaces isometric to an octahedron. Steffen's polyhedron is another non-self-intersecting flexible polyhedron derived from Bricard's octahedra.

Bellows conjecture 

In the late 1970s Connelly and D. Sullivan formulated the bellows conjecture stating that the volume of a flexible polyhedron is invariant under flexing.  This conjecture was proved for polyhedra homeomorphic to a sphere by 
The proof extends Piero della Francesca's formula for the volume of a tetrahedron to a formula for the volume of any polyhedron. The extended formula shows that the volume must be a root of a polynomial whose coefficients depend only on the lengths of the polyhedron's edges. Since the edge lengths cannot change as the polyhedron flexes, the volume must remain at one of the finitely many roots of the polynomial, rather than changing continuously.

Scissor congruence 
Connelly conjectured that the Dehn invariant of a flexible polyhedron is invariant under flexing.  This was known as the strong bellows conjecture or (after it was proven in 2018) the strong bellows theorem. Because all configurations of a flexible polyhedron have both the same volume and the same Dehn invariant, they are scissors congruent to each other, meaning that for any two of these configurations it is possible to dissect one of them into polyhedral pieces that can be reassembled to form the other. The total  mean curvature of a flexible polyhedron, defined as the sum of the products of edge lengths with exterior dihedral angles, is a function of the Dehn invariant that is also known to stay constant while a polyhedron flexes.

Generalizations 

See also 
 Flexagon
 Rigid origami

References

Notes

Primary sources

.
.

.
.

.
.

Secondary sources

.
.
.
.

External links
 

Nonconvex polyhedra
Mathematics of rigidity